Entimus is a genus of broad-nosed weevils belonging to the family true weevil and the Entiminae subfamily.

Description 
They usually have green, blue and gold iridescent scales.

Distribution 
These species can be found from Mesoamerica to northeastern Argentina.

List of species & taxonomy 
This genus includes the following eight species:

 Entimus arrogans Pascoe, F.P., 1872
 Entimus granulatus Linnaeus, 1758
 Entimus imperialis (Forster, 1771)
 Entimus excelsus (Viana. 1958)
 Entimus serpafilhoi Morrone, Abadie and Godinho Jr., 2019
 Entimus nobilis Olivier, 1790
 Entimus splendidus Fabricius 1792 - synonym Entimus fastuosus Olivier, 1790
 Entimus sastrei Viana 1958

The following cladogram represents the diversification of Entimus genus according phylogenetic analysis based on external morphology. It shows two vicariant events, where E. arrogans (Mesoamerican) diverged from South American species. Later, E. granulatus (Amazonian).

See also 

Wtaxa
Virtual Beetles

References 

 
Entiminae